Sydhavsøerne (lit. "The South Sea Islands"), sometimes also referred to simply as Lolland-Falster from the two largest islands, is an informal but common term used in Danish to refer to the archipelago just south of Zealand, Denmark's largest island where its capital Copenhagen is located. Part of the Baltic Sea, the term covers Lolland, Falster and Møn as well as the numerous smaller islands of the surrounding straits, fjords and waters.

The name is a parody on the similar Danish name for the South Pacific Islands of Micronesia, Melanesia and Polynesia.

The name is used by Radio Sydhavsøerne, the local radio station covering the area.

The area
The islands are characterised by a mild climate, making them particularly well suited for fruit growing. This is celebrated every year during Sydhavsøerne's Fruit Festival.

Islands of the area
Apart from the three main islands Lolland, Falster and Møn, the archipelago includes:

In Smålandsfarvandet north of Lolland:
 Fejø
 Femø
 Askø
 Vejrø
 Skalø
 Lilleø
 Rågø (83 ha)
 Rågø Kalv (15 ha)
 Lindholm
 Havneø
 Vigsø
 Dyrefod

In Guldborgsund between Lolland and Falster:
 Kalvø (22 ha)
 Barholme

In Storstrømmen between Zealand and Falster:
 Farø
 Masnedø
 Bogø

In Ulvsund between Zealand and Møn:
 Tærø
 Langø
 Lindholm

In Nakskov Fjord:
 Enehøje (93 ha)
 Vejlø (37 ha)
 Slotø (20 ha)
 Barneholm ( 8.5 ha)
 Dueholm
 Munkeholm
 Kåreholm
 Rommerholm

Other islands:
 Enø (off Zealand)
 Glænø (off Zealand)
 Nyord (off Møn)

See also
 List of islands of Denmark
 South Funen Archipelago
 Danish Wadden Sea Islands

References

External links
 Kunstrute Lolland-Falster” en rejse i skønhed på Sydhavsøerne

Archipelagoes of Denmark
Archipelagoes of the Baltic Sea